Stem Cell Research Enhancement Act was the name of two similar bills that both passed through the United States House of Representatives and Senate, but were both vetoed by President George W. Bush and were not enacted into law.

Stem Cell Research Enhancement Act of 2005
The Stem Cell Research Enhancement Act of 2005 was the first bill ever vetoed by United States President George W. Bush, more than five years after his inauguration.  The bill, which passed both houses of Congress, but by less than the two-thirds majority needed to override the veto, would have allowed federal funding of stem cell research on new lines of stem cells derived from discarded human embryos created for fertility treatments.

The bill passed the House of Representatives by a vote of 238 to 194 on May 24, 2005., then passed the Senate by a vote of 63 to 37 on July 18, 2006. President Bush vetoed the bill on July 19, 2006. The House of Representatives then failed to override the veto (235 to 193) on July 19, 2006.

Stem Cell Research Enhancement Act of 2007
The Stem Cell Research Enhancement Act of 2007, was proposed federal legislation that would have amended the Public Health Service Act to provide for human embryonic stem cell research. It was similar in content to the vetoed Stem Cell Research Enhancement Act of 2005.

The bill passed the Senate on April 11, 2007, by a vote of 63-34, then passed the House on June 7, 2007, by a vote of 247-176. President Bush vetoed the bill on June 19, 2007, and an override was not attempted.

Stem Cell Research Enhancement Act of 2009
The bill was re-introduced in the 111th Congress.  It was introduced in the House by Representative Diana DeGette (D-CO) on February 4, 2009.  A Senate version was introduced by Tom Harkin (D-IA) on February 26, 2009.  The House bill had 113 co-sponsors  and the Senate 10 co-sponsors, as of November 20, 2009.

Legislative history

References

External links
How your senator voted, "U.S. Senate Roll Call Votes," from www.senate.gov, recorded on July 18, 2006, accessed on October 31, 2006.
How your congressman voted, "FINAL VOTE RESULTS FOR ROLL CALL 388," from clerk.house.gov, recorded on July 19, 2006, accessed on October 31, 2006.
 Text of the 2007 Bill
 S. 5: Stem Cell Research Enhancement Act of 2007 at GovTrack.us
 World Stem Cell Policies
 |/bss/111search.html|
 Stem cell research pros and cons, Information and resource for stem cell research

Proposed legislation of the 109th United States Congress
Proposed legislation of the 110th United States Congress
Proposed legislation of the 111th United States Congress
Stem cell research
Medical law